Beela Rajesh (born 15 November 1969 in Thoothukudi District) is an Indian Administrative Service (IAS) officer serving as the Secretary of Commercial Taxes and Registration who is predominantly known for been at the forefront of the fight against the COVID-19 pandemic in the Indian state of Tamil Nadu.

Personal life 
Beela Rajesh was born on 15 November 1969 in Thoothukudi District and was based in Kottivakkam locality of Chennai since then. She was born in the already well influenced family, where her mother, Rani Venkatesan is a senior Congress leader and a former MLA while her father, L.N Venkatesan is a retired IPS Officer Director general of police. Rajesh is a MBBS graduate from Madras Medical College and an IAS passout from the 1997 batch.

Career 
In February 2019, Beela Rajesh was appointed as Health Secretary at the Department of Health and Family Welfare of State of Tamil Nadu. Prior to taking charge as the Health Secretary, she served as Commissioner, Indian Medicine and Homeopathy for the state. As a Health Secretary, Rajesh was instrumental in initiating Hospital Management Information System, under which patients data across Tamil Nadu would be digitised and stored in cloud for future reference and research purposes. She played vital role in minimising the number of Dengue cases reported in the state in 2019.

References

External links 

Indian Administrative Service officers
1969 births
COVID-19 pandemic in India
Living people